The following list of Carnegie libraries in Oregon provides detailed information on United States Carnegie libraries in Oregon, where 31 public libraries were built from 25 grants (totaling $478,000) awarded by the Carnegie Corporation of New York from 1901 to 1915. In addition, one academic library was built at Pacific University.

Key

Public libraries

Academic library

See also
 Lists of Oregon-related topics
 List of libraries in Oregon

Notes

References

Note: The above references, while all authoritative, are not entirely mutually consistent. Some details of this list may have been drawn from one of the references without support from the others.  Reader discretion is advised.

Oregon
 
Carnegie libraries
Libraries in Oregon